Ruslan Erbolatuly Dälenov (Ruslan Erbolatūly Dälenov; born 8 February 1975) is a Kazakh politician who served as a Minister of National Economy from 25 February 2019 to 18 January 2021.

Biography

Early life and education 
Dälenov was born in Tselinograd (now Astana). In 1999, he graduated from Marmara University with a degree in economics.

Career 
Dälenov began his professional career at the Ministry of State Revenue, starting as a leading specialist. In 2003, he became the Head of the Department for Analysis and Current Forecasting of Incomes of the Tax Committee of the Ministry of Finance. From September 2003 to January 2005, Dälenov was the Director of the Income Analysis Department of the Ministry of Finance of Kazakhstan. In 2008, he was appointed as the Vice Minister of Finance and from April 2017, he served as the First Vice Minister of National Economy.

On 25 February 2019, by the Decree of the President, he was appointed as the Minister of National Economy. Dälenov served the post until being dismissed on 18 January 2021.

Honours

References 

1975 births
Living people
Nur Otan politicians
Ministers of Economy (Kazakhstan)
People from Astana
Government ministers of Kazakhstan
Marmara University alumni